Joseph Vladimirov (active 1642–1666) was a Russian painter and art theorist of the 17th century.

Biography 
Vladimirov was born in Yaroslavl to iconographer Vladimir Titov. He grew up in the settlement Tolchkovo, in the parish of St. John the Baptist Church, Yaroslavl. In 1646, he lived in the Spasskaya Sloboda with his brother Sava, a priest of the church of Peter of Kiev.

In the years 1642-1644 he was summoned to Moscow and participated in the execution of the paintings for the Assumption Cathedral of the Kremlin. It is known that he was the one to paint icons for the Kremlin Armoury. Also, he took part in painting the walls of the Cathedral of the Archangel (from 1652), Trinity Church in Nikitniki (1652–1653) in Moscow, and Cathedral of the Dormition in Rostov (1659). Together with Simon Ushakov he decorated the royal gates to the church in the Kremlin Palace of Evdokia worked on decorations for the north door to the Cathedral of St. Basil, and repaired five local icons and holy gates. In August 1660, led by Ivan Filateva he worked on repairing wall paintings of the Assumption Cathedral of Moscow.

In September 1657, Vladimirov authored a treatise (addressed to Simon Ushakov), where he advocated the use of chiaroscuro in icon painting. He believed that this method would bring art closer to nature.

References 
 NP Likhachev Tsar "painters " Joseph and his icons. - St. Petersburg., 1897.
 Ovchinnikov ES Joseph Vladimirov. Treatise on the art // DRI . XVII century. - M., 1964. - S. 9-23.
 Ovchinnikov ES Mysterious monogram ( on artistic creativity Joseph Vladimirov ) // Russian literature at the turn of the eras XVII - beginning of XVIII centuries. - M., 1971. - S. 247–263.
 Saltykov AA aesthetic views of Joseph Vladimirov // TODRL. T. XXVIII. - Moscow-Leningrad, 1974. - S. 271–288.
 Bolottseva IP Joseph Vladimirov and iconography Yaroslavl middle of XVII century // Monuments of architecture and art of the Yaroslavl region. - Yaroslavl, 1987. - S. 74–95.
 Belobrova OA Joseph Vladimirov // Proceedings of the Department of Old Russian literature. - Leningrad: Nauka. Leningrad. fin -tion, 1990 . - T. XLIV. - S. 139–141.
 Joseph Vladimirov (Volodimer) // Dictionary Russian painters XI-XVII centuries / Ed. -status. IA Kochetkov. - M.: Indrikis 2003. - S. 125–127.
 Komashko NI Vladimirov (Volodimer) Joseph / / Orthodox encyclopedia

17th-century Russian painters
Russian male painters
Year of birth unknown
Year of death unknown
People from Yaroslavl